Frierson is an unincorporated community and census-designated place (CDP) in DeSoto Parish, Louisiana, United States.

As of the 2010 census, the population was 143. The community is part of the Shreveport–Bossier City Metropolitan Statistical Area.

George Dement, former mayor of Bossier City, Louisiana, retired to his family farm in Frierson, where he died on January 12, 2014.

Demographics

References 

Census-designated places in DeSoto Parish, Louisiana
Unincorporated communities in Louisiana
Populated places in Ark-La-Tex
Census-designated places in Shreveport – Bossier City metropolitan area
Census-designated places in Louisiana